Bellingham most commonly refers to:

 Bellingham, Washington.

Bellingham may also refer to:

Places

Australia
 Bellingham, Tasmania, coastal hamlet in Northern Tasmania

United Kingdom
 Bellingham, London, neighbourhood and electoral ward in the London Borough of Lewisham
 Bellingham, Northumberland, village

United States
 Bellingham, Massachusetts, a town in Norfolk County
 Bellingham (CDP), Massachusetts, a census-designated place within the town
 Bellingham, Minnesota, a city in Lac qui Parle County
 Bellingham, Washington, a city in Whatcom County
 Bellingham Bay, bay in Washington

Other uses 
 Bellingham (surname)
 Bellingham baronets, three baronetcies created for persons with the surname Bellingham, one in the Baronetage of England, one in the Baronetage of Ireland and one in the Baronetage of Great Britain
 Bellingham Bells, a baseball team in Bellingham, Washington
 , a United States Navy cargo ship in commission from 1918 to 1919